George F. Scully Jr. (born February 28, 1952) is an Assistant Professor of Business Law and Business Ethics in the College of Business at the University of Illinois-Chicago; he was a judge on the Illinois Circuit Court of Cook County, having been sworn in February 27, 2009, and retiring from the bench in July, 2016. Scully was a Democratic member of the Illinois House of Representatives, representing the 80th District for twelve years after defeating Flora Ciarlo in the 1996 general election. The district was located in southern Cook County, including parts of Park Forest, Olympia Fields, Flossmoor, Lansing, Lynwood, Glenwood, Beecher, University Park, and all of Chicago Heights, South Chicago Heights, Steger, Crete, and Sauk Village.

Michael B. Barrett was elected to the vacancy created by Scully's resignation.

References

External links
Illinois General Assembly - Representative George Scully Jr. (D) 58th District official IL House website
Bills Committees
Project Vote Smart - Representative George F. Scully Jr. (IL) profile
Follow the Money - George Scully
2006 2004 2002 2000 1998 1996 campaign contributions
Illinois House Democrats - George F. Scully Jr. profile
recent article Jan 2012

Members of the Illinois House of Representatives
1952 births
Living people
Northern Illinois University alumni
21st-century American politicians
People from Evergreen Park, Illinois
Judges of the Circuit Court of Cook County